Bard Academy at Simon's Rock is a private, co-ed boarding school for grades 9 through 10 located in Great Barrington, Massachusetts, USA. Students finish high school in two years, and after 10th grade, students have guaranteed admission to early college at Bard College at Simon's Rock. Students at Bard Academy are taught by the same professors as Bard College at Simon's Rock. Together the programs create a six-year course of study, consisting of three two-year programs: Bard Academy, the A.A. degree, and the B.A. degree. Students can enter at the Academy or A.A. sections. Some students transfer after the A.A. degree, while others stay for the B.A. Ian Bickford, a graduate of Bard College at Simon's Rock, is the founding dean of Bard Academy and was appointed provost of Bard College at Simon's Rock in 2016.

Two-year high school
Bard Academy is a new pedagogical model where students complete high school in two years. Then after high school, students earn an A.A. degree when the typical student would be graduating from high school. Bard Academy is accredited by the New England Association of Schools and Colleges, which means that it is not required to follow the Common Core curriculum. Also, since early college admission is built into the curriculum, Bard Academy students typically don't take standardized tests or focus on college admission applications.

References

Private high schools in Massachusetts
Boarding schools in Massachusetts
Schools in Berkshire County, Massachusetts